Internet Society – Bulgaria is a non-governmental organization (NGO) for public benefit, founded on December 4, 1995, in Sofia by a group of Bulgarian Internet professionals.

History 
ISOC-Bulgaria was founded in 1995. It became known worldwide in 1999, when it successfully sued the government of Ivan Kostov against the proposed licensing of the Internet Service Providers in Bulgaria.

In 2001, through ISOC-Bulgaria's influence, Voice over Internet Protocol (VoIP) remained outside of the monopoly of the national telecom, which allowed a great variety of new Internet service providers to start operating in Bulgaria.

Activities 
ISOC-Bulgaria has been involved in a number of projects, related to usage and promotion of free and open source software, among them: 
 - the Free and Open Source Software Project for South East Europe;
 - towards Open Source Software adoption and dissemination;
 - Free/Libre/Open Source Software: Worldwide impact study.

In 2005 — 2006 ISOC-Bulgaria launched the Bulgarian version of Creative Commons.

ISOC Bulgaria was a key player during the WSIS (2002–2005).

Before that, in 1999 and in 2001 through its influence, Bulgaria became the first country to legally accept full freedom of access to the Internet by changing its Telecommunications Law, which leaves the domain name system and the IP Address allocation outside of the control of the government.

ISOC Bulgaria has been actively involved in the  Global Internet Policy Initiative (GIPI), headed by George Sadowsky, and has contributed to formation of governmental IT-policy in a number of countries, not only in Bulgaria.

Since 2002 ISOC Bulgaria has been running, together with Access to Information Program, the Bulgarian edition of the Big Brother Awards, with their latest edition in 2019. The awards are given to institutions, organizations and individuals, who violate citizens' privacy in Bulgaria.

Members 
Among hundreds of its members are former Bulgarian presidents Georgi Parvanov and Peter Stoyanov, former prime ministers Sergey Stanishev and Ivan Kostov, many politicians, IT-experts, journalists, and many others.

Board 
ISOC-Bulgaria board consists of: 
 Veni Markovski - chairman
 Dimitar Ganchev - vice-chairman
 Georgi Kirov - member

More information 
ISOC-Bulgaria is an official chapter of the international Internet Society, based in Reston, Virginia and Geneva, Switzerland. 
More information can be found at ISOC-Bulgaria's web site, and on their blog.

References 

Internet governance organizations
History of the Internet
Internet in Bulgaria
Digital rights organizations
Internet Society
Organizations established in 1995